Hilco Global is an American financial services holding company. It operates over twenty businesses and specializes in asset valuation, advisory, monetization, and disposition services. Headquartered in Northbrook, Illinois, it has offices throughout the world and provides services to companies, their lenders and professional services advisers across a broad spectrum of business categories including retail, commercial, industrial and financial.  Hilco Global delivers services focused on maximizing the value of under-performing and excess retail, consumer products and industrial inventory, real estate, intellectual property, including consumer brands, patents, and accounts receivable. Hilco Global is also considered one of the largest distressed investment and advisory companies in the world.

History

Hilco Global was founded in 1987 by Jeff Hecktman. Originally operating under the name Hilco Trading, the holding company was renamed in 2013, eliminating the use of the name Hilco Trading Company as well as introducing a new logo and website for the company. Hecktman founded Hilco Trading Company after restructuring his family's industrial supply firm and selling off many of the business' under performing assets.

In 2000, Hilco Global founded a business division named Hilco Merchant Resources LLC, a subsidiary of the company that specializes in retail inventory valuation, retail store closings, retail inventory disposition, fixture, furniture, and equipment disposition, and asset protection. Michael Keefe and Cory Lipoff, formerly of Gordon Brothers, joined HMR the same year with Keefe becoming the CEO. In 2001, the division became known as one of the top five liquidation firms in the United States, having been involved in the $1.8 billion liquidation of Montgomery Ward following that company's bankruptcy. Some of its most notable disposition and liquidation deals included work for Sears, Sears Canada, CompUSA, Sportmart, PharMor Rx, Coldwater Creek, Charming Charlie, and Target Canada. In 2016, the division helped save Aéropostale from final liquidation, eventually allowing the retailer to restructure and reopen over 500 stores. As Toys "R" Us stores closed in 2018, Hilco Merchant Resources oversaw the nearly $2 billion liquidation of their inventory and assets. Hilco Merchant Resources also expanded its operations by opening an office in Australia, taking on retail inventory liquidations of stores that include Fletcher Jones, Dubbo Everyday Living and Dick Smith. In 2019, Hilco Global launched ReStore Capital which resolves shipping and stocking problems between vendors and retailers. ReStore Capital buys shipments from vendors and then consigns the goods to retailers.

Hilco Global founded its real estate business division in 2000 with the formation of Hilco Real Estate, LLC, to be a national provider of accelerated real estate disposition and advisory services. It has acted as agent or principal for numerous real estate acquisitions and sales. It was co-founded by Mitchell Kahn who served as the company's CEO until 2008. Kahn was replaced by Neil Aaronson as CEO and Gregory Apter was promoted to President of the company. Hilco Real Estate was responsible for numerous large transactions in real estate including 1,200 leases for MCI Worldcom that the company either sold or renegotiated. It also closed hundreds of Blockbuster stores following the company's 2010 bankruptcy as well as approximately 200 Borders Book Stores following that company's 2011 bankruptcy. Hilco Real Estate was also involved with the selling of over 165 unused properties owned by Hostess after that company filed for bankruptcy in 2013.

Hilco Global launched Hilco Capital in 2000. Based in the United Kingdom, Hilco Capital is involved in retail restructuring and distressed investments. It has expanded internationally with the opening of offices in Ireland, Spain, Germany, Canada, and Australia.   

In 2001 Hilco Global formed a business unit called Hilco Appraisal Services LLC, bundling all of the industrial, retail and real estate appraisal services of the holding company into a single unit. Later renamed Hilco Valuation Services, the company is based in the U.S. and has global offices in the U.K., Canada, Australia, Mexico, South American and Asia. One of this units most notable deals was completed in 2005 with the valuation of 29 locations of over 40 million square feet owned by Delphi Automotive.

2001 was also the year Hilco Global expanded its holdings with the formation of Hilco Receivables LLC, a division that purchases bad debt and services accounts receivable. By 2004, Hilco Receivables had acquired more than $2 billion in receivables and in 2006 it opened a 200-person collection center that operated under the name Apex Financial, LLC. The company also provides receivable appraisals to lenders as well as financing to companies who acquire receivables portfolios. One of the most notable transactions involving Hilco Receivables was the purchase of $25 million in account receivables from National Envelope Corporation after its bankruptcy in 2013.

In 2004, Hilco Global acquired a retail strategic consulting practice from Arthur Andersen called Senn Delaney – SD Consulting. In 2013, the consulting practice was rebranded as Hilco Retail Consulting or HRC Advisory.

Hilco Global began drawing attention from major investors in 2006 when it was announced that Goldman Sachs Group and Cerberus Capital Management were in talks to purchase a significant stake in the company. Hecktman sold part of the company to both investment companies to help finance other ventures, including private equity style buyouts of faded consumer brands. In 2019, Hilco Global sold 27% of itself to La Caisse de dépôt et placement du Québec (CDPQ), a company which manages public Canadian pension and insurance funds. In May 2019, Hilco subsidiary H19 Capital acquired the assets of 19th Capital Group, an Indianapolis transportation and truck leasing company.

Hilco Brands was formed from the initial investment as an extension of Hilco Consumer Capital, another company held by Hilco Global. One of the first brands purchased was Halston, a notable fashion line that became popular in the 1970s. Additional brands purchased by Hilco include the Ram and Tommy Armour golf club lines, both companies that were previously based in Chicago, as well as Le Tigre, Haute Hippie, Portico, Under the Canopy, Linens 'n Things, and Polaroid. Hilco then sold the Polaroid brand and its related intellectual property in 2017 to the Smolokowski family, a Polish group of investors. In 2017, Hilco Brands invested in the startup company StreetTrend LLC, a luxury sneaker producer.

Hilco Streambank is an additional subsidiary added to the Hilco Global family in 2011. The company was formed to provide services for intellectual property brands such as Borders, Posh, Tots, Linens N’ Things and Circuit City. Hilco Streambank is also known for its IPv4 auction marketplace used for the purchase and sale of IPv4 assets. In 2019, Hilco Streambank helped Johnson Publishing organize an auction for their Ebony and Jet magazine photograph archive after Johnson went bankrupt. Hilco Streambank also managed the intellectual property sale for Charming Charlie in 2019 after they went bankrupt including their trademarks, domain names, customer data, and social media assets. In 2020, Hilco Streambank managed the marketing and selling of all Earth Fare stores, leases, and intellectual property after they filed for bankruptcy.

Hilco Global expanded its real estate business in 2012 with the formation of Hilco Real Estate Finance LLC, a lending division of Hilco Real Estate. Hilco Real Estate Finance operated as a private real estate mortgage lending company and in a year and a half had originated loans in approximately 20 states. Hilco Global sold Hilco Real Estate Finance in 2014 to the private equity firm Garrison Investment Group. The cost of the deal was undisclosed with the overall value of the purchase adding to Garrison's already $3.5 billion in assets. After the sale, the company was rebranded as Jordan Capital Finance.

Hilco Global's Industrial unit, Hilco Industrial LLC, made national news in 2014 with its involvement in the disposition of excess municipal transportation assets for the City of Detroit following the city's bankruptcy, the largest municipal bankruptcy filing in the history of the United States. Prior to its involvement with the City of Detroit, Hilco Industrial played a role in the sale of Chrysler and GM plants in 2010. In Australia, Hilco Industrial liquidated the last remaining automotive manufacturing plant on the continent, Toyota Altona.

In 2012, Hilco Redevelopment Partners bought the Sparrows Point Steel Mill in Maryland to demolish and rebuild as a warehouse distribution hub, renamed Tradepoint Atlantic. The deal has operated in partnership with Baltimore-based investment firm Redwood Capital Partners.

In 2017, Hilco Redevelopment Partners bought the Crawford Generating Station in Little Village, Chicago, to transform the space into an updated distribution center called Exchange 55.

After the Philadelphia Energy Solutions refinery burned down and went bankrupt in 2019, Hilco Redevelopment Partners bought the plant for $225.5 million. Hilco will carry out the dismantling of the plant and an extensive remediation effort before beginning projects on the site.

References

Financial services companies established in 1987
Companies based in Northbrook, Illinois
American companies established in 1987